Robertson Karoo is a semi-arid vegetation type, restricted to sections of the Breede River Valley, Western Cape Province, South Africa. It is a subtype of Succulent Karoo (geographically an extension of the "Little Karoo") and is characterised by the dominance of succulent plant species, and by several endemic plants and animals.

Location and extent
This vegetation type occurs in several large patches within the Breede River Valley, in the Western Cape Province of South Africa. It occurs in the area between Worcester in the north-west, Ashton in the east, and the Riviersonderend mountains in the south.

Landscape and climate

Robertson Karoo typically consists of low hills and flats covered in small succulent vegetation, usually growing on rocky shale-based soils. The climate is semi-arid due to the region lying in the rainshadow of the large mountain ranges to the south-west, but the rainfall does tend to occur mainly in winter.

This vegetation type has a large number of endemic species and several endemic genera.

Some associated plant species
Aloe microstigma
Haworthia pumila
 Haworthia reticulata
Cotyledon orbiculata
Gasteria disticha
Astroloba rubriflora
Conophytum ficiforme
Euphorbia burmannii
Euphorbia mauritanica var. corallothamnus (dominant on the typical raised "heuweltjies")
Crassula rupestris
Ruschia caroli
Euclea undulata
Helichrysum hamulosum
Stapelia paniculata subsp. scitula
Eriocephalus africanus
Eriospermum bayeri
Eriospermum bowieanum
Stayneria spp. (endemic genus)
Brianhuntleya spp. (endemic genus)
Drosanthemum spp.
Pelargonium spp.

Some associated animal species
Aloeides lutescens (endemic)
Bradypodion gutturale (endemic)

See also
 Karoo
 Karoo Desert National Botanical Garden

References

 

Karoo
Flora of South Africa
Physiographic provinces
Geography of the Western Cape